Maximilien Luce (13 March 1858 – 6 February 1941) was a prolific French Neo-impressionist artist, known for his paintings, illustrations, engravings, and graphic art, and also for his anarchist activism. Starting as an engraver, he then concentrated on painting, first as an Impressionist, then as a Pointillist, and finally returning to Impressionism.

Early life and education

Maximilien-Jules-Constant Luce was born on 13 March 1858 in Paris. His parents, of modest means, were Charles-Désiré Luce (1823–1888), a railway clerk, and Louise-Joséphine Dunas (1822–1878). The family lived in the Montparnasse, a working-class district of Paris. Luce attended school at l'Ecole communale, beginning in 1864.

In 1872, the fourteen-year-old Luce became an apprentice with wood-engraver Henri-Théophile Hildebrand (1824–1897). During his three-year xylography apprenticeship, he also took night classes in drawing from instructors Truffet and Jules-Ernest Paris (1827–1895). During this period, Luce started painting in oils. He moved with his family to the southern Paris suburb of Montrouge. His art education continued as he attended drawing classes taught by Diogène Maillard (1840–1926) at the Gobelins tapestry factory.

Luce began working in the studio of Eugène Froment (1844–1900) in 1876, producing woodcut prints for various publications, including L'Illustration and London's The Graphic. He took additional art courses, at l'Académie Suisse, and also in the studio of portrait painter Carolus-Duran (1837–1917). Through Froment's studio, Luce became friends with Léo Gausson and Émile-Gustave Cavallo-Péduzzi. These three artists spent time around Lagny-sur-Marne creating Impressionist landscapes.

Work

Luce spent four years in the military, starting in 1879, serving in Brittany at Guingamp. The next year, he received a promotion to corporal, and he became friends with Alexandre Millerand, who, in 1920, assumed the office of President of France. In 1881 he requested the restoration of his lower rank of soldier, second class. Carolus-Duran used his influence to get a transfer for Luce to Paris barracks. His stint in the military came to a close in 1883.

The prevalence of the new zincography printing process rendered xylography nearly obsolete as a profession. When the opportunities for employment as an engraver became scarce, Luce shifted his focus to painting full-time in about 1883.

Gausson and Cavallo-Péduzzi introduced Luce in about 1884 to the Divisionist technique developed by Georges Seurat. This influenced Luce to begin painting in the Pointillist style. In contrast to Seurat's detached manner, Luce's paintings were passionate portrayals of contemporary subjects, depicting the "violent effects of light". He moved to Montmartre in 1887. Luce joined the Société des Artistes Indépendants and participated in their third spring exhibition, where Paul Signac purchased one of his pieces, La Toilette. Camille Pissarro and critic Félix Fénéon were also impressed by the seven Luce works displayed in the show. Fénéon characterized Luce as a "coarse, honest man, with a rough and muscular talent". In addition to Pissarro and Signac, he met many of the other Neo-impressionists, including Seurat, Henri-Edmond Cross, Charles Angrand, Armand Guillaumin, Hippolyte Petitjean, Albert Dubois-Pillet, and Pissarro's son Lucien. A New York Times critic declared this Pointillist period to be the pinnacle of Luce's artistic career, singling out the radiant 1895 painting On the Bank of the Seine at Poissy as an example. He described the skillfully executed painting as "a lyrical celebration of nature".

With the exception of the years 1915 to 1919, Luce exhibited in every show at Les Indépendants from 1887 until he died in 1941, including a thirty-year retrospective held in 1926. In 1909, he was elected Vice President of the Société des Artistes Indépendants, and was elected President in 1935, following the death of Signac, who had held the post since 1908. However, in 1940 he resigned from the position as a protest against the Vichy regime's laws which would have prohibited Jewish artists from participating in the group. Luce had his first solo exhibition, arranged by Fénéon, in July 1888, exhibiting ten paintings at the La Revue indépendante offices. He showed six paintings at the 1889 Les XX exhibition in Brussels. While there, he met Les XX official Octave Maus, as well as Symbolist poet Emile Verhaeren and fellow Neo-impressionist painter Théo van Rysselberghe. Luce's work was also featured in the ninth Les XX exhibition, in 1892.

In the spring of 1892 Luce traveled with Pissarro to London. Later that year, he visited Saint-Tropez with Signac, and in the summer of 1893, he went to Brittany.

Starting near the early part of the twentieth century, his identification with the Neo-impressionists began to disappear, as he became less active politically, and his artistic style shifted from Neo-impressionism, and he resumed painting in an Impressionist manner. Some of his paintings during this period depicted wounded World War I soldiers arriving from the battlefront to Paris.

Luce depicted a diverse range of subjects in his works over a long career. He most frequently created landscapes, but his other works include portraits, still lifes (especially florals), domestic scenes, such as bathers, and images of welders, rolling mill operators, and other laborers.

Anarchism

Luce aligned with the Neo-impressionists not only in their artistic techniques, but also in their political philosophy of anarchism. Many of his illustrations were featured in socialist periodicals, notably La Révolte, Jean Grave's magazine which was later called Les Temps nouveaux. Other socialist/anarchist publications which he contributed to include Le Père Peinard, Le Chambard, and La Guerre sociale. On 8 July 1894, Luce, suspected of involvement in  June assassination of President of France Marie François Sadi Carnot, was arrested and was confined to Mazas Prison. He was released forty two days later, on 17 August, following his acquittal at the Procès des trente. He published Mazas, an album consisting of ten lithographs documenting the experiences of himself and other political prisoners incarcerated in Mazas; accompanying the lithographs was text by Jules Vallès. In 1896, while King Alfonso XIII of Spain was visiting Paris, the police detained Luce on the grounds that he was a "dangerous anarchist".

Luce's choice of subject matter for his art was often rooted in his political beliefs. Through his paintings, he passionately demonstrated empathy and fellowship with the proletariat.

Family

In 1893, Luce met Ambroisine "Simone" Bouin in Paris. She became his model, companion, common-law wife, and wife. Bouin was usually referred to as "Madame Luce", even before their eventual marriage. She was frequently a model for him, appearing in many of his works, often partially or fully nude, other times depicted in scenes such as on a balcony or combing her hair. The couple's first son, Frédérick, was born on 5 June 1894, but he died fifteen months later, on 2 September 1895. Their second child, whom they also named Frédérick, was born in 1896, and in 1903 they adopted Ambroisine's nephew Georges Édouard Bouin, who had become orphaned. The couple got married on 30 March 1940 in Paris; just a few months later, Ambroisine died, in Rolleboise, on 7 June 1940.

Death and assessment

Luce died at his Paris home on 7 February 1941, at the age of 83. He was buried in Rolleboise. In May 1941, the Bibliothèque nationale de France held a memorial exhibition, and another memorial exhibition was mounted at Les Indépendants from March to April 1942.

Luce was among the most productive of the Neo-impressionists, creating over two thousand oil paintings, a comparably large number of watercolors, gouaches, pastels, and drawings, plus over a hundred prints.

The Musée d'Orsay assesses Luce as "one of the best representatives of the neo-impressionist movement". Although he had had many solo exhibitions of his work in France, the first one in the United States did not occur until a 1997 retrospective at Wildenstein & Company in Manhattan.

Collections
Public collections containing Luce's work include:

Art Institute of Chicago
Benton Museum of Art at Pomona College
Cleveland Museum of Art
Davis Museum and Cultural Center (Wellesley College)
Dixon Gallery and Gardens
Fine Arts Museums of San Francisco
Harvard University Art Museums
High Museum (Atlanta, Georgia)
Honolulu Museum of Art
Indiana University Art Museum (Bloomington)
Indianapolis Museum of Art
Kröller-Müller Museum (Otterlo, Netherlands)
Los Angeles County Museum of Art
Memphis Brooks Museum of Art
Metropolitan Museum of Art
Michele and Donald D’Amour Museum of Fine Arts (Springfield, Massachusetts, U.S.A.)
Minneapolis Institute of Arts
Musée d'art moderne (Troyes)
Musée de l'Annonciade (Saint-Tropez)
Musée des Beaux-Arts de Rouen
Musée des Impressionnismes (Giverny)
Musée d'Orsay
Musée Lambinet (Versailles)
The Museum of Fine Arts, Houston
Museum of Grenoble
New Art Gallery (Walsall, England)
Palazzo Ruspoli (Rome)
Portland Museum of Art (Maine)
Princeton University Art Museum
Saint Louis Art Museum (Missouri)
San Diego Museum of Art (California)
Thyssen-Bornemisza Museum (Madrid)
Wallraf-Richartz Museum (Cologne, Germany)

Gallery

References

Sources

Further reading

Bouin-Luce, Jean and Denise Bazetoux, Maximilien Luce, catalogue raisonné de l'œuvre peint, Paris, Editions JBL, 1986–2005.
Brown, Stephen, "Luce, the artist engage," Ph.D. dissertation, Columbia University, New York, N.Y. 2003
Cazeau, Philippe, Maximilien Luce, Lausanne, Bibliothèque des arts, 1982.
Fénéon, Fanny, Correspondance de Fanny & Félix Fénéon avec Maximilien Luce, illustrée par Luce de portraits originaux, Tusson, Charetnte, Du Lérot, 2001.
Luce, Maximilien, Maximilien Luce, peindre la condition humaine, Paris, Somogy éditions d'art, 2000.
Luce, Maximilien, Maximilien Luce, Palais des beaux-arts, [Charleroi] 29 octobre-4 decembre 1966, Charleroi, Palais des beaux-arts, 1966.
Mantes-la-Jolie, Inspirations de bords de Seine, Maximilien Luce et les peintres de son époque, Paris, Somogy, 2004.

External links

 Maximilien Luce - Findlay Galleries
 Maximilien Luce on ArtNet

19th-century French painters
French male painters
20th-century French painters
20th-century male artists
Post-impressionist painters
Painters from Paris
Pointillism
French anarchists
1858 births
1941 deaths
20th-century French printmakers